{{DISPLAYTITLE:C20H21NO3}}
The molecular formula C20H21NO3 (molar mass: 323.38 g/mol, exact mass: 323.1521 u) may refer to:

 Dimefline
 Mepixanox (Pimexone)